Isaías Marques Soares (born 17 November 1963), known simply as Isaías, is a Brazilian former professional footballer who played as a forward.

He notably played in the Primeira Liga where he made a total of 279 matches and 97 goals during ten seasons, mainly with Benfica where he spent five of those years, winning three major titles. He also played in the Premier League for Coventry City where he was the first Brazilian to play in the league. He also played for Fluminense, Friburguense, Rio Ave, Boavista and Campomaiorense.

Football career
Born in Linhares, Espírito Santo, Isaías started his career with Fluminense FC, where he had an unassuming spell. He then represented Friburguense Atlético Clube and Associação Desportiva Cabofriense, and moved to Portugal in 1987, gradually moving up the ranks: first with Rio Ave F.C. then Boavista FC, arriving at S.L. Benfica in 1990.

With Benfica, he quickly became a fan favourite at the Estádio da Luz, being also referred to as a "force of nature" due to his stamina and combativeness – he also scored regularly, being the owner of a powerful long-range shot. Arguably his greatest moment with the Lisbon side came on 6 November 1991, in the last round prior to the group stage of the season's European Cup: against Arsenal, at Highbury Park, he assisted once and netted twice in a 3–1 win (4–2 aggregate success). Sporting coach Bobby Robson found him to be the most impressive player in the Portuguese league.

However, Isaías would be left out of the Benfica squad in 1995 by coach Artur Jorge, who was proceeding to a team reshuffle that would result in the darkest period in the club's history – at that time, the veteran was still one of the squad's most influential players and top scorers.

Subsequently, Isaías moved to England with Coventry City for £500.000, signing a two-year contract and becoming the first Brazilian to ever play in the Premier League. He featured in just 14 competitive matches for the Sky Blues over a period of two seasons, due to differences with manager Gordon Strachan and his refusal to cancel his contract after no compensation would be paid. Isaías scored twice during his time for Coventry in games against Chelsea and Middlesbrough.

In 1997, aged nearly 34, Isaías returned to Portugal with S.C. Campomaiorense, reaching the final of the Taça de Portugal in 1999. He retired in his country at almost 40 with Cabofriense, then appeared in a few games with the Portuguese beach soccer team courtesy of his previously obtained citizenship.

Honours
Benfica
Primeira Liga: 1990–91, 1993–94
Taça de Portugal: 1992–93

Campomaiorense
Taça de Portugal runner-up: 1998–99

References

External links

1963 births
Living people
People from Linhares
Brazilian footballers
Association football forwards
Fluminense FC players
Friburguense Atlético Clube players
Associação Desportiva Cabofriense players
Primeira Liga players
Rio Ave F.C. players
Boavista F.C. players
S.L. Benfica footballers
S.C. Campomaiorense players
Premier League players
Coventry City F.C. players
Brazilian expatriate footballers
Expatriate footballers in Portugal
Expatriate footballers in England
Brazilian expatriate sportspeople in Portugal
Brazilian expatriate sportspeople in England
Sportspeople from Espírito Santo